Kyung Soo-jin (born November 5, 1987) is a South Korean actress.

Career 
After supporting roles in Man from the Equator, That Winter, the Wind Blows and Shark, she played her first leading role in TV Novel: Eunhui. She then played the second female lead in sports drama Weightlifting Fairy Kim Bok-joo, and starred in the romantic fantasy drama Meloholic.

In November 2018, Kyung signed with YG Entertainment. On December 16, 2021, it was reported that Kyung had decided to renew her contract with YG Entertainment.

Filmography

Film

Television series

Web series

Music videos

Awards and nominations

References

External links

 
 
 

21st-century South Korean actresses
South Korean television actresses
South Korean film actresses
Living people
1987 births
People from Incheon
YG Entertainment artists